Dennis Franklin Kinlaw (June 26, 1922 – April 10, 2017), was a Wesleyan-Holiness Old Testament Scholar, former President of Asbury College.

Biography
Kinlaw was born in Lumberton, N.C. on June 26, 1922.

He held a B.A from Asbury College (1943), an M.Div from Asbury Theological Seminary (1946), and M.A. and Ph.D. from Brandeis University. 

He was President of Asbury College from 1968-1981 and 1986-1991 and Chancellor of the school in 1992. Prior, he was a professor of Old Testament Languages and Literature at Asbury Theological Seminary (1963-1968) and a visiting professor at Seoul Theological College, Seoul, South Korea in 1959. 

He was the founder of the Francis Asbury Society and authored several books. The Kinlaw Library on Asbury College's campus is named in honor of both the late Dennis Kinlaw and his late wife, Elsie.

Theology
Kinlaw was a Wesleyan theologian. He had Wesleyan-Holiness views.

Publication

Books
 Preaching in the Spirit (Francis Asbury Press, 1985)
 The Mind of Christ (Francis Asbury Press, 1998)
 We Live as Christ (Francis Asbury Press, 2001)
 This Day with the Master: 365 Daily Meditations (Francis Asbury Press, 2002; Zondervan, 2004)
 Let's Start with Jesus: A New Way of Doing Theology (Zondervan, 2005)
 La Mente De Cristo, Spanish translation of The Mind of Christ (Francis Asbury Press, 2006)

Chapters

Notes and references

Citations

Sources

External links
Kinlaw Bio at Asbury College Archives
Francis Asbury Society Home Page
Asbury College Home Page
Asbury Theological Seminary Home Page
Kinlaw Library at Asbury College

1922 births
2017 deaths
20th-century Christian biblical scholars
Arminian theologians
Asbury Theological Seminary alumni
Brandeis University alumni
Presidents of Asbury University